Jyrki Kiiskinen (born 1963) is a Finnish poet and recipient of the Eino Leino Prize in 1993 along with Jukka Koskelainen.

References

Finnish writers
Recipients of the Eino Leino Prize
1963 births
Living people
Date of birth missing (living people)